Helen Jones is a British Labour politician.

Helen Jones may also refer to:

Helen Mary Jones (born 1960), Welsh Plaid Cymru politician
Helen Patricia Jones (1926–2018), South Australian historian and educationist
Helen Jones-Kelley, director of the Ohio Department of Job and Family Services
Helen Jones Woods (1923–2020)), American jazz trombonist

See also
Ellen Jones (disambiguation)